Krasnooktyabrsky District is the name of several administrative and municipal districts in Russia.

Districts of the federal subjects

Krasnooktyabrsky District, Nizhny Novgorod Oblast, an administrative and municipal district of Nizhny Novgorod Oblast

City divisions
Krasnooktyabrsky City District, a city district of Volgograd, the administrative center of Volgograd Oblast

See also
Krasnooktyabrsky (disambiguation)

References